Indi Home is a skyscraper located in the Tsuen Wan district of the New Territories in Hong Kong. The building was completed in 2005. It was developed by Chinese Estates Groups under the name of its subsidiary Kwong Sang Hong Limited. IndiHome, which stands as the joint 45th-tallest building in Hong Kong, is composed almost entirely of residential units, of which there are 950; the lower floors also have retailing space.

Politics
Indi Home is located in Tsuen Wan South constituency of the Tsuen Wan District Council. It is currently represented by Antonio Luk Ling-chung, who was elected in the 2019 elections.

See also
List of tallest buildings in Hong Kong

References

Buildings and structures completed in 2005
Residential skyscrapers in Hong Kong